Jeffrey Christopher Astwood OBE (born March 1933) was a member of the Parliament of Bermuda for Sandys North from 1968 to 1980.

References

External links
https://offshoreleaks.icij.org/nodes/80031481

United Bermuda Party politicians
Members of the Parliament of Bermuda
Members of the Order of the British Empire
1933 births
Living people